The Winnipeg Rifles are a Canadian football team based in Winnipeg, Manitoba.  The Rifles are members of the Canadian Junior Football League and play their home games in Maple Grove Park.

History

Junior football in Winnipeg dates back to the 1920s, with the formation of the Manitoba Junior Football League. In 1953, teams from Winnipeg began playing in the CJFL, the most successful being the Winnipeg Rods, who won three championships.  Those teams would eventually fold or merge. The Winnipeg Hawkeyes were the last Winnipeg-based team prior to the Rifles, folding in 1996.

In 1999, an effort to bring back a team to Winnipeg was headed by James Ladd (Manitoba Football Hall of Fame inductee).  The team began play in the CJFL in 2002, playing out of Canad Inns Stadium.  From 2013 to 2019, the Rifles began to play out of IG Field. As of the 2021 season, home games are played at Maple Grove Rugby Park in St. Vital.

The team is named after the Royal Winnipeg Rifles Regiment that was founded in 1883.

Games

External links

 Winnipeg Rifles official site
Canadian Junior Football League

Sports clubs established in 2002
Canadian Junior Football League teams
Canadian football teams in Winnipeg
2002 establishments in Manitoba